Klaus Mysen (born 15 June 1953) is a Norwegian sport wrestler.

He was born in Oslo and represented the club Kolbotn IL. He won a bronze medal in Greco-Roman wrestling at the 1985 World Wrestling Championships.

He placed fourth at the 1981 World Wrestling Championships, and competed at the 1984 Summer Olympics.

References

External links
 

1953 births
Living people
Sportspeople from Oslo
Olympic wrestlers of Norway
Wrestlers at the 1984 Summer Olympics
Norwegian male sport wrestlers
World Wrestling Championships medalists